Soldier Township is a township in Jackson County, Kansas, USA.  As of the 2000 census, its population was 403.

History
Soldier Township was formed in 1872.

Geography
Soldier Township covers an area of 42.63 square miles (110.4 square kilometers); of this, 0.07 square miles (0.19 square kilometers) or 0.17 percent is water.

Cities and towns
 Soldier

Adjacent townships
 Reilly Township, Nemaha County (north)
 Jefferson Township (east)
 Banner Township (southeast)
 Grant Township (south)
 Lincoln Township, Pottawatomie County (southwest)
 Grant Township, Pottawatomie County (west)
 Red Vermillion Township, Nemaha County (northwest)

Major highways
 K-63

References
 U.S. Board on Geographic Names (GNIS)
 United States Census Bureau cartographic boundary files

External links
 US-Counties.com
 City-Data.com

Townships in Jackson County, Kansas
Townships in Kansas